Light Up the Sky! (also known as Skywatch) is a 1960 British comedy drama film directed by Lewis Gilbert and starring Ian Carmichael, Tommy Steele and Benny Hill. The film also features Dick Emery in a minor role.

Light Up the Sky! was based on Robert Storey's West End play Touch it Light.

Plot
During the Second World War, Lieutenant Ogleby (Ian Carmichael) is the officer in charge of a number of soldiers assigned to a searchlight and gunnery unit, somewhere in England. Ogleby visits only occasionally to check up on the unit. In his absence Lance Bombardier Tomlinson (Victor Maddern) is in charge, but he struggles to maintain some kind of order over the other men and he frequently turns a blind eye to their lack of discipline and even their local thieving.

Camp comic Syd McGaffey (Benny Hill) tries to keep up with the romantic antics of his younger brother Eric (Tommy Steele) who comes back from a short leave and announces that he has got married. He soon takes up with a local girl and gets her pregnant, falling foul of her father. Ted Green (Sydney Tafler) is a widower with a son serving overseas and he eagerly maintains a correspondence with him. Leslie Smith (Johnny Briggs) is lovesick and unhappy over a misunderstanding with his girlfriend and eventually goes AWOL to get to see her. Roland Kenyon (Harry Locke) is the unit's cook and a father of six children. He has ambitions to get a posting to a catering unit.

Cast

 Ian Carmichael as Lieutenant Ogleby
 Tommy Steele as Eric McGaffey
 Benny Hill as Syd McGaffey
 Sydney Tafler as Ted Green
 Victor Maddern as Lance Bombardier Tomlinson
 Harry Locke as Roland Kenyon
 Johnny Briggs as Leslie Smith
 Cyril Smith as 'Spinner' Rice
 Dick Emery as Harry
 Cardew Robinson as Compere
 Susan Burnet as Jean
 Sheila Hancock as Theatre Act
 Fred Griffiths as Mr. Jennings

Production
Light Up the Sky! was based on the play, Touch It Light which premiered in 1957. Producer and director Lewis Gilbert liked it and arranged for it to be filmed. "There have been countless films featuring heroic officers and I feel it is time the ordinary private is given his due," said Gilbert.

Light Up the Sky! was Tommy Steele's first dramatic role. Lionel Bart who wrote songs for Steele's first three films, wrote a song for this film called, "Touch It Light" which Steele performs with Hill.

Criterion Film Productions provided £22,500 of the budget and Tommy Steele deferred £7,500 of his fee.

Reception

Box Office
Light Up the Sky! earned Bryanston a small profit of £4,466. Kine Weekly called it a "money maker" at the British box office in 1960.

Critical reception
The Guardian in 1960 described Light Up the Sky! as a "small, sensible and somehow touching film with a whiff of authenticity about it".

The Radio Times dismissed it as a "hackneyed theatrical hand-me-down". Eleanor Mannikka at Allmovie called it an "unexceptional comedy". TV Guide called it "pointless", but observed Benny Hill "exhibits the form that would later make him a popular television star in both the UK and US" and admitted to finding the film "occasionally amusing". Film Threat called it "A great little wartime drama" and asked "Why isn't this gem better known?" Film reviewer Peter Burnett noted that "for British nostalgia fans and cineastes in general, it will be a fabulous treat".

References

Notes

Citations

Bibliography

 Reid, John Howard. America's Best, Britain's Finest: A Survey of Mixed Movies. Morrisville, North Carolina: Lulu.com, 2006. .

External links

Light Up the Sky at Letterbox DVD
Light Up the Sky at BFI

1960 films
Films directed by Lewis Gilbert
British aviation films
British comedy-drama films
British black-and-white films
1960 comedy-drama films
Films scored by Douglas Gamley
Films set in the 1940s
World War II aviation films
British films based on plays
Military humor in film
1960s English-language films
1960s British films
English-language comedy-drama films